Let's Say Goodbye Like We Said Hello is a compilation of Ernest Tubb recordings from 1947 to 1953, released in 1991. It is a 5-CD box set and contains 113 songs. The set includes extensive liner notes, session notes and photographs.

Among the songs are performances by Tubb with Red Foley, The Andrews Sisters, and Minnie Pearl.

Reception

In his Allmusic review, Bruce Eder describes the album as "These 119 songs over five CDs represent Ernest Tubb at the very peak of his career musically and commercially, from 1947 until 1953. Disc One is filled with winners; Tubb's voice on these and the rest of the songs in this collection is at its richest and most expressive, not exactly soaring (it never did that) but never straining into the top of his range..."

Track listing

Personnel
Ernest Tubb – vocals, guitar
Red Foley – vocals
Minnie Pearl – vocals
LaVerne Andrews – vocals
Maxene Andrews – vocals
Patty Andrews – vocals
Jerry Byrd – steel guitar
Jack Drake – bass
Owen Bradley – piano, organ
Farris Coursey – drums
Buddy Harman – drums
Dickie Harris – steel guitar
Don Helms – steel guitar
Billy Robinson – steel guitar
Bill Drake – guitar
Billy Byrd – guitar
Hank Garland – guitar
Walter Garland – guitar
Grady Martin – guitar
Jack Shook – guitar
Jimmie Short – guitar
Leon Short – guitar
Johnny "Tub" Johnson – guitar
Hal Smith – fiddle
Thomas Lee Jackson Jr. – fiddle
Mack Mcgarr – mandolin
Alcyone Beasley – choir, chorus
Dottie Dillard – choir, chorus
Evelyn Wilson – choir, chorus
Anita Kerr Singers – choir, chorus
The Sunshine Trio – choir, chorus
Production notes:
Paul Cohen – producer
Dave Kapp – producer
Richard Weize – reissue producer
Rebecca Everett – mastering
R.A. Andreas – photography, illustrations
Robert K. Oermann – photography, illustrations
Don Roy – photography, illustrations
Ekkehard Schumann – photography, illustrations
Jerry Strobel – photography, illustrations
Elaine Tubb – vocals, photography, illustrations
Ronnie Pugh – liner notes, discography

References

1991 compilation albums
Ernest Tubb compilation albums